150 (one hundred [and] fifty) is the natural number following 149 and preceding 151.

In mathematics 
150 is the sum of eight consecutive primes (7 + 11 + 13 + 17 + 19 + 23 + 29 + 31). Given 150, the Mertens function returns 0.
150 is conjectured to be the only minimal difference greater than 1 of any increasing arithmetic progression of n primes (in this case, n = 7) that is not a primorial (a product of the first m primes).
The sum of Euler's totient function φ(x) over the first twenty-two integers is 150.
150 is a Harshad number and an abundant number.
150 degrees is the measure of the internal angle of a regular dodecagon.

In the Bible
 The last numbered Psalm in the Bible, Psalm 150, considered the one most often set to music.
 The number of sons of Ulam, who were combat archers, in the Census of the men of Israel upon return from exile (I Chronicles 8:40)
 In the Book of Genesis, the number of days the waters from the  Great Flood persisted on the Earth before subsiding.

Manuscripts 
 Uncial 0150
 Minuscule 150
 Lectionary 150

In sports
 In Round 20 of the 2011 AFL season,  inflicted the worst ever defeat on the Gold Coast Suns by 150 points.

In other fields

150 is also:
 The number of degrees in the quincunx astrological aspect explored by Johannes Kepler.
 The approximate value for Dunbar's number, a theoretical value with implications in sociology and anthropology
 The total number of Power Stars in Super Mario 64 DS for the Nintendo DS.
The total number of dragon eggs in Spyro: Year of the Dragon.

See also
 List of highways numbered 150
 United Nations Security Council Resolution 150
 United States Supreme Court cases, Volume 150

References

Integers